The Monroe McKenzie House is located in Palmyra, Wisconsin.

History
McKenzie was a boot and shoe manufacture who also served as a justice of the peace. The house is one of the earliest examples of a concrete structures in the United States. Currently, the Palmyra Historical Society uses it as a museum. It was listed on the National Register of Historic Places in 1985 and on the State Register of Historic Places in 1989.

References

Houses on the National Register of Historic Places in Wisconsin
National Register of Historic Places in Jefferson County, Wisconsin
Houses in Jefferson County, Wisconsin
Historical society museums in Wisconsin
Historic house museums in Wisconsin
Museums in Jefferson County, Wisconsin
Greek Revival houses in Wisconsin
Concrete buildings and structures
Houses completed in 1845